Audun Mortensen (born 24 November 1985) is a Norwegian writer and artist. Mortensen has published ten books with Flamme Forlag, and, as an artist, has been included in several exhibitions, including at the Gagosian Gallery in New York City.

Mortensen was born in Seoul, South Korea.

Bibliography 
 Alle forteller meg hvor bra jeg er i tilfelle jeg blir det, Flamme Forlag (2009), 
 Roman, Flamme Forlag (2010), 
 Surf's Up, Traumawien (2010)
 This Year's Model, Atelier Series (2011)
 Aaliyah, Flamme Forlag (2011), 
 The Collected Jokes of Slavoj Žižek, Flamme Forlag (2012), 
 27 519 tegn med mellomrom, Flamme Forlag (2013), 
 Žižek's Jokes, MIT Press (2014), 
 Dyr jeg har møtt, Flamme Forlag (2014), 
 Samleren, Flamme Forlag (2015), 
 Nylig historikk, Flamme Forlag (2016), 
 Fire dager i Berlin, Flamme Forlag (2017), 
 Fotballspillere som rimer, Flamme Forlag (2018), 
 Footballers who rhyme, If a leaf falls (2018), edited by Sam Riviere
 Forventninger til ny teknologi, Flamme Forlag (2018),

Authorship 
Mortensen's debut book, Alle forteller meg hvor bra jeg er i tilfelle jeg blir det (Everyone Tells Me How Great I Am in Case I Become It), was named 2009's best debut poetry book by Norway's largest newspaper, Aftenposten. Mortensen has been called "Norway's most modern author" and has been named one of the country's 30 young talents  by Dagens Næringsliv. In 2011 he self-published his coffee table book The Collected Jokes of Slavoj Zizek, which he later sold to MIT Press, which republished his work in numerous languages under the title Zizek's Jokes

Flamme Forlag published Mortensen's novel Samleren – in English, The Collector –  in October 2015. The book was later publicly announced by Mortensen to be a remake of the novel The Burnt Orange Heresy (1971) by American writer Charles Willeford.

Willeford's novel was according to Mortensen, translated with Google Translate. Mortensen himself leaked the information about his method and intention, first during a lecture, then in an interview.

Following a prolonged public debate about the book, the publisher retracted the book May 13, 2017, and paid an unknown amount to the Charles Willeford's estate. However, the publisher uphold their opinion that the book could not be understood as ordinary plagiarism. The publisher insisted that the book was meant to address a grey area that they wanted to be debated.

When the book was retracted from the market, Mortensen sold two copies of his book on Finn.

Translations 
 Jeg elsker deg (I Am Going to Clone Myself Then Kill the Clone and Eat It, by Sam Pink), Flamme Forlag (2010)
 Ut og stjæle fra American Apparel (Shoplifting from American Apparel, by Tao Lin), Cappelen Damm (2011),

Notes

External links 
 Official site

1985 births
Living people
21st-century Norwegian poets
Norwegian male poets
Norwegian artists
Norwegian people of Korean descent
South Korean emigrants to Norway
21st-century Norwegian male writers